The Mayor of South Wairarapa is the head of municipal government for South Wairarapa District of New Zealand, which is administered by a district council. The office has existed since the 1989 local government reforms, when the Featherston County, Greytown Borough, Featherston Borough and Martinborough Borough were amalgamated.

The current mayor is Martin Connelly.

List of mayors of South Wairarapa

List of deputy mayors of South Wairarapa

References

South Wairarapa
South Wairarapa